The 501st Combat Support Wing (501 CSW) is an administrative support wing of the United States Air Force, based at RAF Alconbury, United Kingdom. It is one of three wings located in the United Kingdom as components of the Third Air Force and United States Air Forces in Europe – Air Forces Africa (USAFE-AFAFRICA).

Units

 the 501st Combat Support Wing is made up of the following units:
 422nd Air Base Group (422 ABG) (RAF Croughton, United Kingdom)
 420th Air Base Squadron (420 ABS) (RAF Fairford, United Kingdom)
 420th Munitions Squadron (420 MUNS) (RAF Welford, United Kingdom)
 422nd Air Base Squadron (422 ABS)
 422nd Civil Engineer Squadron (422 CES)
 422nd Communications Squadron (422 CS)
 422nd Medical Squadron (422 MDS)
 422nd Security Forces Squadron (422 SFS)

 423rd Air Base Group (423 ABG) (RAF Alconbury, United Kingdom)
 421st Air Base Squadron (421 ABS) (RAF Menwith Hill, United Kingdom)
 423rd Civil Engineer Squadron (423 CES)
 423rd Communications Squadron (423 CS)
 423rd Force Support Squadron (423 FSS)
 423rd Medical Squadron (423 MDS)
 423rd Security Forces Squadron (423 SFS)
 426th Air Base Squadron (426 ABS) (Sola Air Station, Norway)

History

The 501st Combat Support Wing traces its lineage and heritage back to the 501st Bombardment Group, Very Heavy, established on 25 May 1944 and activated on 1 June 1944 at Dalhart Army Airfield, Texas. The unit moved to Harvard Army Air Field, NE, on 22 August and started training with the Boeing B-29 Superfortress (B-29B variant), equipped with the APQ-7 Eagle radar for precision high-altitude all-weather bombing. Along with the other three groups of the 315th Bombardment Wing, their mission was to finish taking out the Japanese oil refining, distribution and storage network. Deploying in April 1945 to new airfields built on Guam, crews flew 15 combat missions before the war ended, earning a Distinguished Unit Citation for attacks on Japanese oil targets in the closing days of WW II. The group then flew numerous missions airdropping food and supplies for Allied prisoners of war in POW camps across Japan, Korea, Manchuria and China. The group inactivated on 10 June 1946.

701st Tactical Missile Wing

The 701st Tactical Missile Wing was established on 3 August 1956 and activated on 15 September 1956 at Hahn Air Base, West Germany; the history and heritage of the 701 TMW and 501 TMW was consolidated in 1982. The first tactical missile wing in the U.S. Air Force when activated, it replaced the 7382d Guided Missile Group (Tactical) and controlled three tactical missile groups, each with TM-61C Matador-equipped missile squadrons. In turn, the wing was inactivated on 18 June 1958 and replaced by the 38th Tactical Missile Wing.

501st Tactical Missile Wing

Redesignated as the 501st Tactical Missile Wing on 11 January 1982, it was activated on 1 July 1982, at RAF Greenham Common, England, to operate the Gryphon (BGM-109G) Ground Launched Cruise Missile (GLCM). The 501 TMW was inactivated on 31 May 1991 after ratification of the Intermediate-Range Nuclear Forces Treaty resulted in decommissioning of the BGM-109G. The USAF's first GLCM wing when it stood up, it was the also the last GLCM wing to be inactivated.

501st Combat Support Wing

The unit was redesignated the 501st Combat Support Wing on 22 March 2005 and activated on 12 May 2005 at RAF Mildenhall, England, to manage and support geographically separated USAF units, installations and activities in the United Kingdom not directly supporting operations at RAF Mildenhall or RAF Lakenheath. Effective 1 May 2007, it relocated to RAF Alconbury.

The 501 CSW currently oversees and supports four Air Base Groups operating a total of eleven installations and operating locations in the U.K. and Norway; the 420th Air Base Group at Royal Air Force (RAF) Fairford and RAF Welford; the 421st Air Base Group at RAF Menwith Hill; the 422d Air Base Group at RAF Croughton; and the 423d Air Base Group at RAF Alconbury, including RAF Molesworth, RAF Upwood and Sola Air Station (what the USAF calls Stavanger Air Base) in Norway.  The 501st CSW also serves as the administrative agent for NATO in the U.K.

RAF Fairford and RAF Welford house the 420th Air Base Group.  Their mission is to receive, bed-down and sustain munitions to enable U.S. and NATO forces to conduct full-spectrum flying operations from USAFE's only bomber-forward operating location.  RAF Fairford is a forward operating location for the Boeing B-52, the B-1 and the B-2 bomber aircraft. It also assists in U-2 aircraft deployment, deployed operations training and serves as an alternate landing site for the U.S. Space Shuttle.  RAF Fairford annually hosts the world's largest military airshow called the Royal International Air Tattoo (RIAT); typically held in July.

RAF Welford comprises 806 acres and is bordered by a 31,680 foot fence-line.  They are home to the U.S. Air Forces in Europe's second largest munitions hub. The installation currently maintains 15,000 bombs; over a $160 million stockpile.

RAF Menwith Hill houses the 421st Air Base Group. Their mission is to ensure a full range of base support services for an installation populace of 4,500 military, civilians, contractors and their families.  The group hosts 10 multi-national, multi-service, multi-agency units performing U.S. and U.K. cryptologic missions and provides base mission support to RAF Menwith Hill. Menwith Hill Station serves as an integral part of the UKUSA intelligence network serving U.K., U.S. and their allied interests.

RAF Croughton houses the 422nd Air Base Group whose mission is to provide installation support, services, force protection, and worldwide communications across the entire spectrum of operations. The group is the premier global communication provider in the U.K. and supports NATO, U.S. European Command, U.S. Central Command, Air Force Special Operations Command, U.S. Department of State operations and Ministry of Defense operations. The group sustains more than 450 C2 circuits; and supports 25 percent of all European Theater to continental United States (CONUS) communications.

RAF Alconbury houses the 423rd Air Base Group whose mission is to provide mission support services to the Joint Intelligent Operations Center Europe (JIOCEUR) Analytic Center (commonly known as the Joint Analysis Center), NATO's Intelligence Fusion Center, and the RAF Alconbury, RAF Molesworth and RAF Upwood and Stavanger Air Base (Norway) communities. RAF Alconbury is also home to the 501st CSW headquarters staff and hosts a community of 6,000 individuals associated with more than 15 multi-service and multi-national units.

RAF Upwood houses the medical and dental facilities for the RAF Alconbury, RAF Molesworth, and RAF Upwood communities.

Sola Air Station ("Stavanger Air Base" to the USAF) in southern Norway is also under the 501st CSW and houses the 426th Air Base Squadron.  The squadron mission is to provide base-level support to 220 U.S. service members and their families at NATO's Joint Warfare Center. The squadron also supports "Operating Location-A" in Oslo, Norway, shipping for $50 million war readiness material and $900 million U.S. Marine Corps and U.S. Navy equipment.

In total, the 501st CSW has almost 2,600 U.S. military and civilian employees directly assigned, including non-appropriated fund employees. There are also 117 U.K. personnel who work directly for the wing in appropriated and non-appropriated positions and more than 180 U.K. Ministry of Defence Police, Defense Schools and our many tenant units along with family members and retirees who reside in the United Kingdom.

2007-08 leadership issues 
The 423d Air Base Group commander, Col. Robert G. Steele, was dismissed from his position on 18 January 2008 by the 501 CSW commander after only 6 months in command. The reason Col. Kimberly Toney gave was "I lost confidence in Col. Steele's ability to lead the group." No criminal charges were filed against Col. Steele. The group commander of RAF Croughton, Col. John Jordan, was brought in to dually command the group at RAF Alconbury. The 501 CSW commander acknowledged the period was a "Painful challenge" and the 501 CSW commander (Col. Kimberly Toney) made a statement in an interview to the Stars and Stripes newspaper that indicated the members of the 423rd ABG "blame themselves" for the sacking of Steele.

Move to RAF Fairford 
In December 2022, the wing's new headquarters at RAF Fairford was unveiled during a ribbon cutting ceremony. The first elements are due to relocate there during the summer of 2023.

Lineage 
 Established as 501st Bombardment Group, Very Heavy, on 25 May 1944.
 Activated on 1 Jun 1944; Inactivated on 10 Jun 1946.
 Consolidated (11 Jan 1982) with 701st Tactical Missile Wing, which was established on 3 Aug 1956.  
 Activated on 15 Sep 1956.  
 Inactivated on 18 Jun 1958. 
Redesignated 501st Tactical Missile Wing on 11 Jan 1982.  
 Activated on 1 Jul 1982.  
 Inactivated on 31 May 1991.  
 Redesignated 501st Combat Support Wing on 22 Mar 2005.  
 Activated on 12 May 2005.

Wing Commanders

Capt Harry L. Young, 27 Jun 1944
Lt Col Arch G. Campbell, Jr., 6 Jul 1944
Col Boyd Hubbard, Jr., 11 Aug 1944
Col Vincent M. Miles, Jr., 15 Apr – 20 May 1946
Not manned, 21 May – 10 Jun 1946
Lt Col Robert F. Zachmann 15 Sep 1956
Col Theodore H. Runyon 7 Jan 1957 – 18 Jun 1958
Col Robert M. Thompson, 1 Jul 1982
Col John Bacs, 25 Jan 1985
Col William E. Jones, 2 June 1987
Col Richard P. Riddick, 21 Jul 1988
Col Wendell S. Brande, 7 Jan – 31 May 1991
Col Blake F. Lindner, 12 May 2005
Col Kimberly K. Toney, 21 Jun 2007

Unit Decorations and Honors
Distinguished Unit Citation (Japan) 6 – 13 Jul 1945
Asiatic-Pacific Campaign Streamers: Air Offensive, Japan Eastern Mandates, Western Pacific
Air Force Outstanding Unit Award: 15 Sep 1956 – 30 Apr 1958, 1 Jul 1982 – 30 Jun 1984, 1 Jul 1987 – 31 May 1989, 1 Jun 1989 – 31 May 1991

References

External links
 Air Force Historical Research Agency
 Official website

Wings of the United States Air Force
Military units and formations established in 2005